Western High School is an accredited public high school located in Anaheim, California, serving students in grades 9–12. The school is one of ten high schools in the Anaheim Union High School District. It is located in the western end of Anaheim and also serves southwest Buena Park and northwest Stanton. It was established in 1954. The school's mascot is the Pioneer.

Academics

Western High is a two time California Distinguished High School.

Athletics
Athletic teams compete in the CIF Southern Section of the California Interscholastic Federation and are known as the "Pioneers". Notable athletes from the school include Tiger Woods and Andy Messersmith.

In 2007, the Pioneers won the 2007 CIF wrestling championship. The annual football game between Western and its rival Anaheim High School is referred to as the traditional "Bell Game", with the winning school receiving the Victory Bell. Western High School offers the following sports:

Fall
 Football
 Marching Band
 Volleyball
 Boys' Cross-Country
 Girls' Cross-Country
 Girls' Golf
 Girls' Tennis
 Boys' Water Polo
 Cheerleading

Winter
 Boys' Basketball
 Girls' Basketball
 Wrestling
 Boys' Bowling
 Girls' Bowling
 Girls' Water Polo
 Winter Cheerleading
 Winter Guard

Spring
 Baseball
 Boys' Golf
 Boys' Tennis
 Girls' Soccer
 Boys' Soccer
 Boys'/Girls' Swimming
 Softball
 Boys' Track and Field
 Girls' Track and Field

Notable staff and alumni
David Gilliland, NASCAR Sprint Cup Series driver
Mike Iupati, National Football League (NFL) offensive lineman 
Andy Messersmith, Major League Baseball (MLB) pitcher 
Fili Moala, NFL player 
John Moses, MLB outfielder
Dana Nafziger, NFL football player 
Lute Olson, NCAA basketball coach
Mike Penner, sportswriter for Los Angeles Times
Carol Rodríguez, Puerto Rican sprinter
Randy Schekman, cell biologist, winner of 2013 Nobel Prize for Physiology or Medicine
Rich Severson, MLB infielder
Tiger Woods, professional golfer

References

External links
Western High School website
History of Western High School (Archive)
Anaheim Union High School District website

Educational institutions established in 1954
High schools in Anaheim, California
Public high schools in California
1954 establishments in California